Fabien Ceddy Farnolle (born 2 February 1985) is a former professional footballer who played as a goalkeeper. Born in France, he represented the Benin national team at international level.

Club career
Born in Bordeaux, Farnolle joined Girondins de Bordeaux at the age of ten. He was promoted to the senior side in 2002 at the age of 17. His stay in the senior side was short-lived as he was relegated to Bordeaux's reserve side, where he remained for his entire first spell at Bordeaux. His three-year spell with the reserve side saw him play very little with fifteen appearances made over the three years playing for Bordeaux's B team. He left Les Girondins in the summer of 2005 for Portugal. Farnolle signed for Primeira Liga side Vitória de Setúbal.

He impressed manager Luís Norton de Matos, who kept him in the first team squad, where he competed to be Setúbal's number one choice goalkeeper alongside Marcelo Moretto and Marco Tábuas. Despite impressing Setúbal's manager, he was beaten to the starting line up by Marcelo Moretto. His relegation to the bench saw him be relegated to Setúbal's B team, who at the time were playing in the Portuguese Second Division.

Following the end of the 2005–06 season, he left the Sadinos and return to France to play for US Quevilly, where he remained for one season. Over the next few seasons, he moved to several different clubs in the quest to play more first-team football, including a return to Bordeaux, where, like his first spell, he ended up relegated to the B team. In the summer of 2010, he left Bordeaux for Ligue 2 side Clermont Foot, where he established himself as Clermont's first choice goalkeeper.

In February 2015, Farnolle signed a contract for three seasons with Romanian club Dinamo București. He played only one game, in the League Cup, then he became a bench-warmer and two months later decided to put an end to the deal.

Farnolle signed for Turkish club Yeni Malatyaspor in June 2017.

International career
Farnolle represented the French France U18 national team at youth level.

In 2012, Farnolle received an invitation by the Benin Football Federation to play for the Benin national side, as he had Beninese parentage who settled in France prior to his birth. After accepting the invitation, he was selected by then manager Manuel Amoros for Benin's first international game of the year.

Farnolle's debut came against Ethiopia in a 2013 Africa Cup of Nations qualifier on 29 February.

Career statistics

References

External links

 
 

1984 births
Footballers from Bordeaux
French sportspeople of Beninese descent
Citizens of Benin through descent
Black French sportspeople
Living people
French footballers
France youth international footballers
Beninese footballers
Benin international footballers
Association football goalkeepers
FC Girondins de Bordeaux players
Vitória F.C. players
US Quevilly-Rouen Métropole players
FC Libourne players
Clermont Foot players
FC Dinamo București players
Le Havre AC players
Yeni Malatyaspor footballers
Büyükşehir Belediye Erzurumspor footballers
Sidama Coffee S.C. players
Ligue 1 players
Championnat National players
Ligue 2 players
Süper Lig players
2019 Africa Cup of Nations players
French expatriate footballers
Beninese expatriate footballers
Expatriate footballers in Portugal
French expatriate sportspeople in Portugal
Beninese expatriate sportspeople in Portugal
Expatriate footballers in Romania
French expatriate sportspeople in Romania
Beninese expatriate sportspeople in Romania
Expatriate footballers in Turkey
French expatriate sportspeople in Turkey
Beninese expatriate sportspeople in Turkey
Expatriate footballers in Ethiopia
French expatriate sportspeople in Ethiopia
Beninese expatriate sportspeople in Ethiopia